Nsikak-Abasi Essien Eduok  (11 July 1947 – 6 January 2021) was the Chief of the Air Staff of the Nigerian Air Force between 1996 and 1999.

Early life 
Nsikak Eduok was born to the family of Essien Eduok of Mbak in Ibesikpo Asutan local government in Akwa Ibom State.

Career 
Nsikak Eduok after his education began working for VON for a short while as a studio manager. In 1968 Nsikak enrolled in the NAF as a probable pilot. Air Marshal Nsikak Eduok obtained his first military exercise from the Nigerian Defence Academy before going for his principal flying training in 1970. In 1971 after completing his principal training he went through the Basic Flying training course and emerged the best overall student. In that same year he was assigned Second Lieutenant. Between 1971 and 1986 he attended several flying courses which included Advanced and Tactical Flying training course, Aircraft Accident Investigation course, MiG-21 Conversion Course in the Soviet Union, Advanced Staff Course in United Kingdom.

In 1991, he attended USAF Air War College in Alabama where he graduated in 1992. Between 1975 and 1976, Nsikak Eduok was the first Operations Officer of the Makurdi Strike Group . He was the Commanding Officer of NAF Station, Enugu and the first Commander of the 75th Fighter Squadron.

Nsikak Eduok also has a street "Nsikak Eduok Avenue" in Akwa Ibom named after him by the past governor of the state.

Nsikak Eduok died on 6 January 2021.

Awards 
 National, Defence, Independence and Republic Medals
 Distinguished Service Star and the Meritorious Service Star Medals

References 

1947 births
2021 deaths
Nigerian Air Force air marshals
People from Akwa Ibom State